William J. R. Jackson (born 19 October 1915) is a former Rhodesian international lawn bowler.

Jackson won two bronze medals at the Commonwealth Games; a singles bronze at the 1958 British Empire and Commonwealth Games in Cardiff and a pairs bronze at the 1962 British Empire and Commonwealth Games in Perth.

References

1915 births
Possibly living people
Sportspeople from Cape Town
South African emigrants to Rhodesia
South African male bowls players
Zimbabwean male bowls players
Bowls players at the 1958 British Empire and Commonwealth Games
Bowls players at the 1962 British Empire and Commonwealth Games
Commonwealth Games bronze medallists for Southern Rhodesia
Commonwealth Games bronze medallists for Rhodesia and Nyasaland
Commonwealth Games medallists in lawn bowls
Medallists at the 1958 British Empire and Commonwealth Games
Medallists at the 1962 British Empire and Commonwealth Games